April Terri Winchell (born January 4, 1960) is an American actress, writer, and radio host. She is perhaps best known as the second and current voice of Clarabelle Cow, having voiced the character since 1996.

Early life
Winchell was born in 1960. She is the daughter of inventor, ventriloquist and comedian Paul Winchell (1922–2005; the original voice of Tigger), and his second wife, Nina Russel. In her weblog writings and appearances on radio, she describes her childhood with many references to the great talent of her father as well as the many disturbing incidents owing to his mental health issues.

Career

Acting

Winchell's projects include the role of Sylvia in Wander Over Yonder, a Disney Channel animated series featuring Jack McBrayer in the title role. Created by The Powerpuff Girls producers Craig McCracken and Lauren Faust, the show chronicles the adventures of Wander and his trusty (and cynical) steed Sylvia, as they travel the universe. The series premiered on the Disney Channel in September 2013.

As a voice actress, she has been heard in hundreds of animated television series, such as Goof Troop (as Peg Pete), Recess (as Mrs. Muriel Finster), Disney's House of Mouse and Mickey Mouse Clubhouse (as Clarabelle Cow), Bonkers (as Lucky's wife, Dyl Piquel), Pepper Ann (as title character's mom, Lydia Pearson), and Kids from Room 402 (as Miss Gracie Graves the school teacher, along with several other characters that appear on the show), The Legend of Tarzan (taking over for Rosie O'Donnell as Terk in the original film), 101 Dalmatians: The Series (as Cruella De Vil), SWAT Kats: The Radical Squadron (as Molly Mange), Robot and Monster, Phineas & Ferb, Kim Possible Queen of Heart of Alice in Wonderland  Teress MacNeil Respectively  .

She has also voiced characters in numerous films, including Antz, Who Framed Roger Rabbit, Monsters University and Rob Zombie's The Haunted World of El Superbeasto. Winchell portrayed the "Glendale Federal Bank" lady – a cranky, cynical customer alleviated by the service at her new bank – in a series of radio commercials, which Winchell wrote and directed herself. The commercials caught the attention of Roseanne Barr, who hired her as a writer on Barr's eponymous sitcom.

Radio
Besides her many contributions to radio advertising as a director, writer, and performer, Winchell also hosted a radio talk show program on KFI, a Los Angeles radio station. This weekend program aired for three years, and enjoyed the fastest growth audience in the history of the station. Subsequent to the end of this program in November 2002, she appeared semi-regularly on the Ask Mr. KABC program, on KABC, an AM station also in Los Angeles – until the show ended in February 2007.

In 2005, Winchell signed a deal with U.S. pay-TV service HBO to develop and host a show on Sirius Satellite Radio. However, on her official website on May 3, 2006, she announced that negotiations had stalled out between HBO and Sirius, leaving her program in limbo.

On March 16, 2007, she returned to semi-regular radio appearances on The Marc "Mr. K" Germain Show on KTLK-AM (the new show hosted by the former Mr. KABC) and appeared twice a month. (Her appearances on Germain's show are available at her website in addition to KTLK's website.) During March, Winchell was "banned for life" from KABC (AM) in Los Angeles at the behest of ABC radio host Bill O'Reilly, over a retelling of an occurrence she dubbed "Croissantgate" (KABC provided Bill O'Reilly with croissants that were not fresh enough for his taste, causing a commotion at the station).

Theater

As a musical theater actor, she starred as Ado Annie in the Columbia Artists revival of Oklahoma!, and also appeared opposite Kevin Spacey in Gypsy.

Additionally, Winchell wrote and starred as "Sheila Sands" in her show at the Roxy Theatre in Los Angeles to sold out crowds. The show was produced by Lily Tomlin and Jane Wagner, who discovered her at Cafe Largo in Hollywood. Winchell reprised the character to open for Brad Garrett at the MGM Grand in Las Vegas in 2013.

She has also been a frequent panelist on the live-stage version of What's My Line at the Acme Comedy Theatre in Hollywood.

Advertising
In 1992, Winchell and her then-husband Mick Kuisel formed Radio Savant Productions, a radio advertising production company.  Since that time, Winchell has received many awards including Cannes, Clio, The $100,000 Mercury Award and The International Grand Andy (bestowed by The Association of Independent Commercial Producers) – it was the only time the Andy was given for radio. Winchell also provided the award-winning radio and television advertising for Big Bear Mountain Resorts for over 20 years.

Internet
Winchell's official website contains a link to her IMDB biography and library of unusual and outsider music pieces.

Prior to 2009, Winchell maintained a personal Web site that, in addition to the music pieces, chronicled the actor's activities, which include her professional, personal, and romantic life. In October 2009, Winchell (under the pseudonym "Helen Killer") launched Regretsy, a blog website which satirized Etsy. Within four days, the site had received nearly 90 million hits. This huge viral success caught the attention of Random House, who subsequently won a bidding war to publish a book based around the Regretsy website. The book, which was published April 6, 2010, features humorous and bizarre crafts and artwork from several different artists, as well as essays about Winchell's personal life, childhood and own crafting failures. As of March 1, 2012, the Regretsy site had raised over $200,000 for charitable causes. The popularity of Regretsy's "Not Remotely Steampunk" section even inspired a viral "chap hop" music video. Winchell ceased updating Regretsy on February 1, 2013.

Winchell made several appearances on early episodes of the internet broadcast series "Talk Radio One," interviewed by former Los Angeles radio personality Marc Germain.  She became a weekly guest on the series beginning in 2017.

Other work
Winchell worked on the 1996 video game Toonstruck in which she voiced a number of characters including Ms. Fit, Polly, Punisher Polly and Dr. Payne's Receptionist. Not only did she voiced the characters but she has also worked as casting and dialogue director for the game. She also worked as a punch writer for Recess: School's Out and wrote three episodes of the American sitcom Roseanne.

Personal life
In broadcasts of her KFI show, on her web diary and several other websites, Winchell revealed she and Kevin Spacey dated after high school.

On August 19, 2005, she announced on her website that she was diagnosed with stage 4 thyroid cancer. To promote solidarity during her radiation treatment, she issued her own "Glow in the Dark" wristbands, so one could "glow along" with April. She made a full recovery.

Winchell is a supporter of charities including Project Angel Food, a Los Angeles-based service providing meals for homebound people living with AIDS. Her website, Regretsy, generated charitable funds through selling of Regretsy merchandise. On, April 17, 2011, Winchell created April's Army, which ran monthly campaigns for which all profits went to a selected Regretsy member who has encountered hardships. On December 5, 2011, Regretsy began a Secret Santa program, collecting donations for presents for needy children.

Filmography

Film

Television

Video games

Live-action

References

External links

 Official website
 
 Current appearances on Talk Radio One

1960 births
Living people
Actresses from Los Angeles
Actresses from New York City
American casting directors
Women casting directors
American child actresses
American film actresses
American television actresses
American musical theatre actresses
American people of Austrian-Jewish descent
American people of Polish-Jewish descent
American people of Russian-Jewish descent
American radio producers
American talk radio hosts
American television writers
American voice actresses
American voice directors
American women comedians
American women screenwriters
American women television writers
Audiobook narrators
Disney people
HIV/AIDS activists
Screenwriters from New York (state)
American women radio presenters
20th-century American actresses
21st-century American actresses
Women radio producers